Danmarks Nationalbank (in Danish often simply Nationalbanken) is the central bank of the Kingdom of Denmark. It is a non-eurozone member of the European System of Central Banks (ESCB). Since its establishment in 1818, the objective of the Nationalbank as an independent and credible institution is to issue the Danish currency, the krone, and ensure its stability. The Board of Governors holds full responsibility for the monetary policy.

The building which houses the bank's headquarters was designed by the renowned architect Arne Jacobsen, in collaboration with Hans Dissing and Otto Weitling. After Jacobsen's death, his office, renamed Dissing+Weitling, has brought the construction to completion.

Danmarks Nationalbank undertakes all functions related to the management of the Danish central-government debt. The division of responsibility is set out in an agreement between the Ministry of Finance of Denmark and Danmarks Nationalbank.

Danish and Faroese banknotes were previously printed at Danmarks Nationalbank's Banknote Printing Works. This practice came to an end 20 December 2016, after which the printing of banknotes has been outsourced due to a reduced demand for cash, and cut in expenses of 100 million kroner until 2020.

History
The bank was established on 1 August 1818 by King Frederick VI of Denmark. The private bank was given a 90-year monopoly on currency issue, which was extended in 1907 out to 1938. In 1914, the National Bank became the sole banker for the Danish government. The bank became fully independent of the government in 1936.

Board of Governors

The Board of Governors consists of three members. The Chairman of the Board of Governors is Governor by Royal Appointment. The two other Governors are appointed by the Board of Directors.

List of Royal Governors

 1818–1818: Christian Klingberg
 1835–1856: Lauritz Nicolai Hvidt
 1821–1861: Nicolai Aagesen 
 1836–1845: Peter Georg Bang
 1856–1861: Hans Peter Hansen
 1861–1892: Moritz Levy
 1868–1888: Wilhelm Sponneck
 1869–1896: Stephan Linnemann
 1873–1887: W.J.A. Ussing
 1873–1896: F.C. Smidt
 1887–1888: Carl Vilhelm Lange
 1896–1913: Søren Christian Knudtzon
 1888–1913: Rasmus Strøm
 1896–1906: Johannes Nellemann
 1907–1924: Jens Peter Winther
 1908–1908: Ole Hansen 
 1908–1920: Johannes Lauridsen
 1913–1939: Westy Stephensen
 1914–1923: Marcus Rubin
 1914–1924: Carl Ussing 
 1920–1923: Jens Peter Dalsgaard
 1923–1931: Holmer Green
 1923–1936: Hans Rosenkrantz
 1924–1932: Jakob Kristian Lindberg
 1925–1936: Frederik Carl Gram Schrøder
 1935–1955: Ove Jepsen
 1936–1949: C.V. Bramsnæs
 1939–1957: Henning Haugen-Johansen
 1949–1950: Holger Koed
 1950–1963: Svend Nielsen
 1956–1963: Siegfried Hartogsohn
 1957–1985: Frede Sunesen
 1963–1985: Svend Andersen
 1965–1994: Erik Hoffmeyer
 1980–1996: Ole Thomasen
 1982–1990: Richard Mikkelsen
 1991–2005: Bodil Nyboe Andersen
 1995–2010: Jens Thomsen
 1996–2011: Torben Nielsen
 2005–2013: Nils Bernstein
 2011–2020: Hugo Frey Jensen 
 2011–: Per Callesen
 2013–: Lars Rohde 
 2020-: Signe Krogstrup

Logo
The official logo of the bank is a nineteenth-century version of Denmark's coat of arms showing the insignia of Denmark, Schleswig, and Holstein. The two latter provinces were lost in the 1864 Second War of Schleswig, and the bank is the only official Danish institution still using this insignia. Since the late 19th century, coins minted by the bank carry a heart-shaped mint mark. Before this time, the Mint used a mark showing the royal crown.

See also

Economy of Denmark
Economy of the Faroe Islands
Economy of Greenland
Economy of Europe
European Exchange Rate Mechanism
Financial Supervisory Authority (Denmark)
Payment system
Real-time gross settlement

References

External links

Arne Jacobsen buildings
Buildings and structures completed in 1970
Economy of Denmark
Banks of Denmark
Central banks
Banknote printing companies
European System of Central Banks
Modernist architecture in Copenhagen
Banks established in 1818
1818 establishments in Denmark
Currencies of the Kingdom of Denmark
Bank buildings in Copenhagen
Listed bank buildings in Denmark